State Route 125 (SR 125) is a north–south route in the U.S. State of Maine that runs between the towns of Freeport and Bowdoinham, passing through Lisbon Falls.

Major intersections

References

External links

Floodgap Roadgap's RoadsAroundME: Maine State Route 125

125
Transportation in Cumberland County, Maine
Transportation in Androscoggin County, Maine
Transportation in Sagadahoc County, Maine